World ov Worms is the debut album by the Norwegian black metal band Zyklon. It was released in 2001 by Candlelight Records.

Track listing 
All lyrics by Bård "Faust" Eithun, with lyrical ideas (on "Terrordrome") and title concept (on "Worm World" and "Zycloned") by Samoth. All songs copyright Abstract Sounds Ltd/Tanglade Music Ltd.

Personnel

Zyklon 
Daemon – lead vocals, main vocal arrangement
Destructhor – lead and bass guitars
Samoth – rhythm and bass guitars
Trym – drums, percussion, programming

Additional musicians 
Trickster G – clean vocals on "Transcendental War…" and spoken words on "Chaos Deathcult"
Thorbjørn Akkerhaugen – programming, effects, keyboard and bass arrangements
Persephone – spoken female voice

Production 
Arranged by Zyklon
Produced by Zyklon and Thorbjørn Akkerhaugen
Recorded, engineered and mixed by Thorbjørn Akkerhaugen
Mastered by Tom Kvalsvoll

References

External links 
"World ov Worms" at discogs

Zyklon albums
2001 debut albums